Turner Valley is a former town in the Calgary Metropolitan Region of Alberta, Canada within the Town of Diamond Valley. It was named after Robert and John Turner who settled in the area in 1886.

The town was once the centre of an oil and natural gas boom. For 30 years, the Turner Valley oilfields were a major supplier of oil and gas and the largest producer in the British Empire.

History 

Turner Valley incorporated as a village on February 23, 1930. After 47 years as a village, Turner Valley incorporated as a town on September 1, 1977. On January 1, 2023, the Town of Turner Valley amalgamated with its neighbouring Town of Black Diamond to form the Town of Diamond Valley.

Turner Valley Gas Plant
W. Stewart Herron, a rancher from nearby Okotoks, gathered investors from local contacts such as James Lougheed, R.B. Bennett and A.E. Cross. Herron himself lacked the technical expertise to drill Turner Valley's fossil-fuel that was some  underground. Herron recruited drilling expert Archibald Dingman, a 19th-century American veteran from Pennsylvania.

On May 14, 1914, A.W. Dingman struck wet natural gas, which produced gasoline. However, in 1920, the main buildings burned to the ground. Herron's group could not afford to rebuild and operate the site. Imperial Oil bought Calgary Petroleum Products, created a subsidiary named Royalite Oil Co., and rebuilt the plant.

The plant ceased operations in 1985 and with the encouragement of a local group, the Turner Valley Oilfield Society, and the most recent owner of the gas plant, the Alberta provincial government, accepted the site as part of its group of historic sites. Since that time Alberta Culture has been at work on the Turner Valley Gas Plant, primarily stabilizing the facility and removing or mitigating the contaminants on the site. In 2014, Alberta Culture held a celebration on May 14, 2014, on the day of the centennial of the discovery of oil on the site. More than 2,000 people attended this full day of events. It is estimated that, along with the $20 million spent on restoring the site, an additional $20 million will be needed to help get the site operational.

Demographics 

Attractions 

Recreation venues include the 18-hole semi-private Turner Valley Golf and Country Club, outdoor Dr. Lander Memorial Pool, an outdoor rink and skateboard park, and Friendship Trail,  paved link to nearby Black Diamond.

Government 
Turner Valley was governed by a town council of seven including a mayor and six councillors. The final mayor of the Town of Turner Valley was Barry Crane.

Education 
Students in kindergarten through grade 6 attend Turner Valley Elementary School. Junior and senior high school students attend Oilfields High School in Black Diamond.

Notable people 
Laureen Harper, wife of former Prime Minister Stephen Harper
Dwight Lodeweges, former professional soccer player
Stanley A. Milner, Canadian businessman and former politician

Gallery

See also 
List of communities in Alberta
List of towns in Alberta
Turner Valley Formation

References

External links 

1930 establishments in Alberta
2023 disestablishments in Alberta
Calgary Region
Former towns in Alberta